Discolops strigicollis is a species of beetle in the family Cerambycidae, and the only species in the genus Discolops. It was described by Fairmaire in 1886.

References

Apomecynini
Beetles described in 1886
Monotypic Cerambycidae genera